Sean O'Neill (born January 21, 1985 in Hamilton, Ontario) is a Canadian producer and television personality. From 2015 to 2017, O'Neill was the host of the CBC Television art challenge show Crash Gallery, and in 2018 he co-created the CBC Television documentary series In the Making, which he executive produced and hosted.

He is the former director of public programs and partnerships at the Art Gallery of Ontario, where he developed projects including First Thursdays and AGO Creative Minds at Massey Hall. 

O'Neill was an actor as a child, and appeared in various Canadian film and television productions including Baby Blues, Never Cry Werewolf and Degrassi: The Next Generation.

In 2020 O'Neill created an arts focussed production company Visitor Media and in association with The National Ballet of Canada produced the documentary Crystal Pite:  Angels' Atlas which premiered at the Vancouver International Film Festival in 2022. "Landmark feature documentary Crystal Pite: Angels' Atlas to premiere this fall".

Filmography

Awards

 Monaco International Film Festival Angel Award (2008), The Cross Road, Best Ensemble Cast

References

External links 
 

1985 births
Canadian male film actors
Canadian male television actors
Canadian male child actors
Canadian television hosts
Living people
Male actors from Hamilton, Ontario
Participants in Canadian reality television series